Bulgaria competed at the 2018 Winter Olympics in Pyeongchang, South Korea, from 9 to 25 February 2018, with 21 competitors in 6 sports.

Competitors
The following is the list of number of competitors participating at the Games per sport/discipline.

Alpine skiing 
Bulgaria has qualified 2 men and 1 female competitors

Men

Women

Biathlon 

Based on their Nations Cup rankings in the 2016–17 Biathlon World Cup, Bulgaria has qualified a team of 5 men and 5 women.

Men

Women

Mixed

Cross-country skiing 
Bulgaria has qualified 2 male and 1 female athletes.

Distance

Sprint

Luge 

Based on the results from the World Cups during the 2017–18 Luge World Cup season, Bulgaria qualified 1 sled.

Ski jumping 
Bulgaria has qualified 1 male athlete: Vladimir Zografski.

Snowboarding 
Bulgaria has qualified 1 male and 1 female athletes. On 25 January they received a reallocation quota in the Women's giant slalom.
Parallel

Snowboard cross

Qualification legend: FA – Qualify to medal final; FB – Qualify to consolation final

References

Nations at the 2018 Winter Olympics
2018
Winter Olympics